Anil Khandelwal (born March 16, 1948) is an author, speaker, corporate advisor and a board member. He is currently on the board of Gail (India) Limited and serves as senior advisor at KPMG, a Maharatna company in the public sector.  As an advisor to Corporates, he is also a board member of Centre for Micro Finance, a company promoted by Sir Ratan Tata Trust, and serves on the governing board of National Institute Securities Market (SEBI).

His past experiences include chairman and managing director of Bank of Baroda, a leading public sector bank which he has since retired from, thereafter occupying the position of chairman at Baroda Pioneer Asset Management Company (2008–2011).

Early life 

Khandelwal was born in Agra, Uttar Pradesh. He completed his Bachelor of Science from Agra College in 1966, Agra. He then pursued a chemical engineering degree from Harcourt Butler Technological Institute, Kanpur, in 1970. Later, he pursued his MBA with specialisation in HR from University of Rajasthan, Jaipur, and received first position. He also completed a postgraduate diploma in labor laws and personnel management from the University of Rajasthan and received first position. He also did a postgraduate diploma in training and development from Indian Society for Training and Development. He also completed his PhD in management, under Dr N R Sheth, director, IIM Ahmedabad

Career 

Khandelwal started his career as a probationary officer in Bank of Baroda in 1971. From 1980 to 1992 he worked as senior core faculty (HR) in Banks Apex Staff College at Ahmedabad.  In 1993 he was appointed principal of the college, and after a short tenure he moved to banks corporate office, Mumbai.  After working as deputy general manager HRM, he shifted to banking operations and rose to the position of general manager, in charge of banks operation in West Bengal and north east, Kolkata.   Based on Khandelwal's extraordinary turnaround of this difficult territory, he was appointed by the Government of India as executive director (a board-level position), Bank of Baroda in September 2000. In 2004 he was appointed as chairman and MD, Dena Bank and after a brief stint of one year he was appointed as chairman and MD of Bank of Baroda, one of the largest public sector banks in India.
Khandelwal has held important positions like president, Indian Institute of Banking and Finance, deputy chairman Indian Banks Association. He has also worked as UNDP consultant to banking commission, government of Tanzania (1989). He has also worked as visiting professor at the Asian Institute of Management, Manila, Philippines (2008).

Awards and recognition 
Khandelwal is a multi-awarded professional. He received:
 Lifetime Achievement Award by The Asian Banker, Singapore,
The only Indian receiving this award so far. This is the highest award available for lifetime achievement in the banking industry in the Asia Pacific & Gulf Region. Award given for Khandelwal's contribution to financial services recognised with The Asian Banker award for Lifetime Achievement in Financial Services. 
Khandelwal's reinvigoration of Bank of Baroda and his passionate appeal to staff and unions to help him turn the bank around from the back office up has made him a globally admired icon within the financial services industry.
Rigorous selection process chaired by Mr David Eldon, chairman, board of directors, Dubai International Financial Centre Authority and former chairman of HSBC Asia Pacific.
 HRD Excellence Award Lifetime Achievement Award 2012 
 Skoch Challenger Person of the Year Award 2008
 Outstanding Contributions to HRD National HRD Award – 2000

Transformation of BoB 

Khandelwal holds the special distinction of transforming one of the largest public sector banks, Bank of Baroda, in the shortest possible time. He introduced many reforms that included introduction of modern technology, re-branding, establishing Gen-Next branches, retail revolution by introducing retail loan factories (one-stop-shop for retail loans) and SME loan factories.  He totally rehashed the human resource system and introduced many employee-centric programmes like employee conclaves, Sampark (hotline to CMD), Samadhan (providing counselling services in metro centres) and Khoj (talent hunting exercise). He engaged staff by face to face interactions at several large and small centres and valued their ideas. He introduced idea-online at bankofbaroda.com to facilitate the flow of creative ideas from employees at all levels. The bank doubled its business in just three years and simultaneously successfully completed technological upgradation providing anytime, anywhere banking through online banking and expanding the ATM facility across the bank. The Bank of Baroda transformation story finds a mention in Harvard Business Review article Leadership Lessons from India, March 2010 and in the book The India Way by Wharton faculty. Based on the transformation of BoB, Khandelwal has authored Dare to Lead (Sage 2011).

Khandelwal Committee 

Khandelwal has been a crusader for introduction of modern HR policies and systems and public sector banks. In the year 2009, Government of India appointed a committee to look at the HR issues of the public sector banks under the chairmanship of Khandelwal. The committee made seminal recommendations to improve the HR in public sector banks. The committee is popularly known as The Khandelwal Committee and is often quoted for initiating reforms in PSBs. Later, in 2011–12, he was appointed chairman of advisory group on HRD by the ministry of Finance, Government of India.

Books and articles 

 HRD, OD, AND INSTITUTION BUILDING: Co - edited, Publication: SAGE (2016)
 CEO, Chess Master or Gardener Publication: Oxford university press (2018)
 Dare to Lead – The Transformation of Bank of Baroda Publication: SAGE Publications (2011)
 Alternative Approaches and Strategies of Human Resource Development Publication: Rawat Publications Jaipur (1987)
 Handbook on Personnel Management and Industrial Relations for Rural Banks Publication: Rawat Publications (1987)
 Human Resources Development in Banks (Edited) Publication: Oxford & IBH Publication, New Delhi
 Industrial Relations in Banks Co-Authored. Publication: OM-AMEYA PRAKASHAN (1986), Mumbai

 The Crucible Project (People Matters – 15 January 2013)
 Missing Link of HR (People Matters – 5 December 2012)
 Leading with Care (People Matters – 2 August 2012)
 CEO Morning Meeting (People Matters – 3 July 2012)
 CEO – Next Destination of the HR Professional (People Matters – 27 June 2012)
 The Reflective Leader (People Matters – 27 June 2012)
 CEOs- the first 100 days (People Matters – June 2012)
 Wisdom is in the field respect it (People Matters – May 2012)
 Board Leadership (People Matters – April 2012)
 The Disciplined Leader (People Matters – 7 February 2012)
 An HR Hero (LRP Publications – 25 June 2007)
 Splitting the Chair in PSU Banks – Public sector banks must be board-driven (The Economic Times)
 Human Resource Development International Enhancing performance, learning and integrity (Routledge Taylor & Francis Group – Vol. 10, No. 2, pp. 203–213, June 2007)
 Microfinance Development Strategy for India (Economic and Political Weekly – Vol. XLII, No. 13, pp. 1127–1136, 13 March 2007)
 Universal Banking: Solution for India's Financial Challenges? (Economic and Political Weekly – Vol. XLI, No. 11, pp. 969–974, 18 March 2006)
 Criticality of HR Reforms for Public Sector Banks in the New Era (Economic and Political Weekly – Vol. XL, No. 12, pp. 1128–1136, 19 March 2005)

References 

 
Crisis in HR 
 Twitter is a highway of freedom 
 Govt banks get nod to hire 11 more EDs  Mint, 14 December 2011
 Govt Clears Creation of New ED Slot in PSBs  (ET- Mumbai, 14 December 2011) 
 State-run banks may be allowed to revamp wages(Mint, 4 October 2011) 
 The path for reforms in PSBs (Live Mint, 22 September 2011) 
 My extraordinary focus on HR issues was unconventional  (The Hindu-Business Line, 9 May 2011) 
 BoB Ex-Chiefs Brush With Colour Codes – current account (The Economic Times, 13 April 2011) 
 Govt needs to take on Unions to save Banks (Mint – The Wall Street Journal, 2011) 
 Govt Accepts Panel Report on HR Plan in PSU Banks (The Economic Times, 2011) 
 Inspiring Success Stories (Money Life, 20 December 2007)

1948 births
Living people
People from Agra
University of Rajasthan alumni
Indian bankers
Businesspeople from Uttar Pradesh